"You'll Never Leave Harlan Alive" is a song written and originally recorded by American musician Darrell Scott. Since his original recording in 1997, the song has also been recorded by Patty Loveless, Brad Paisley, and Kathy Mattea, and performed live by Patty Loveless as a duet with Chris Stapleton at the 2022 Annual Country Music Awards ceremony.Additionally Patty Loveless and Chris Stapleton and his band, which includes his wife Morgane ,performed live "You'll Never Leave Harlan Alive" at Kentucky Rising ,a fundraiser put togehter by Stapleton in November 2022 for the Eastern Kentucky flood victims.

History
Darrell Scott wrote the song in 1997 and recorded it on his debut album Aloha from Nashville. The song is about the life of coal miners within the state of Kentucky. Scott said the inspiration for the song came from a visit to Harlan County, Kentucky, in an attempt to research his own family history. While in a cemetery attempting to find his great-grandfather's grave, he saw the phrase "you'll never leave Harlan alive" on a tombstone. The writers of the Encyclopedia of Great Popular Song Recordings described the song's plot line as being about "a federal lawman who had left his native Harlan County...but winds up dealing with adversaries back on the old home turf."

Following Scott's original version, country music singer Patty Loveless recorded it in 2001 for her album Mountain Soul. Loveless' rendition featured Scott playing banjo. According to Scott, Loveless had difficulty singing the song at first. Her producer and husband, Emory Gordy Jr., placed a picture of Loveless' father (who was a coal miner) before her and told her to "sing the song to her father". In 2002, Loveless' rendition was nominated at the International Bluegrass Music Awards for Song of the Year.

The same year as Loveless, Brad Paisley covered the song on his album Part II. Paisley said that he chose to record the song because, being a native of West Virginia, he had seen the effect that coal mining had on communities in that region. Kathy Mattea also covered it on her 2008 album Coal, a concept album themed around coal mining. Montgomery Gentry recorded it for their 2019 album Outskirts.

In November 2022, Loveless joined Chris Stapleton to perform the song at the 56th Annual Country Music Association Awards.

Chart history

Patty Loveless

References

1997 songs
2001 songs
2022 songs
Songs written by Darrell Scott
Patty Loveless songs
Brad Paisley songs
Kathy Mattea songs
Chris Stapleton songs
Songs about Kentucky